The 12th Annual Helpmann Awards was held on 24 September 2012 at the Sydney Opera House, in Sydney, New South Wales. Administered by Live Performance Australia (LPA), accolades were presented for achievements in disciplines of Australia's live performance sectors, for productions during the season between 1 March 2011 – 31 May 2012.

Awards were handed out in forty-two categories for achievements in theatre, musicals, opera, ballet, dance and concerts.

With the 2012 edition, LPA established the Helpmann Awards Travel Fund which seeks to provide a greater opportunity for productions outside of Melbourne and Sydney to become Nominated for an Award. The Fund provides travel assistance to members of the voting panel, allowing them to attend productions outside of their home states.

Schedule
Source:

Winners and nominees
In the following tables, winners are listed first and highlighted in boldface.

Theatre

Musicals

Opera

Dance and Physical Theatre

Classical Music

Contemporary Music

Other

Industry

Special awards
The JC Williamson Award, a lifetime achievement award, was awarded to the late Indigenous Australian musician Jimmy Little (1 March 1937 – 2 April 2012) and Katharine Brisbane, a theatre journalist and publisher. The Brian Stacey Award, for emerging conductors of live theatre, opera and ballet, was given to Daniel Carter.

See also
 66th Tony Awards
 2012 Laurence Olivier Awards

Notes
A: The full producing credit for Rock of Ages is Rodney Rigby, Michael Cohl, Reagan Silber, Peter Gordon, Barry Habib, Matthew Weaver, Scott Prisand, Carl Levin, Jeff Davis, S2BN Entertainment in association with Janet Billing Rich, Sar Mercer, Michael Minarik, Mariano Tolentino and Hilary Weaver.

References

Helpmann Awards
Helpmann Awards
Helpmann Awards
Helpmann Awards
Helpmann Awards, 12th
Helpmann Awards